Della is an album by singer and actress Della Reese, her first for RCA Victor, after she left Jubilee Records in 1959. The album, produced by Hugo & Luigi, was one of her most successful. It was nominated for a Grammy Award in 1961.

Della was recorded at RCA Victor studios in New York City during three weeks in October 1959, with Reese backed by a big band conducted and arranged by Neal Hefti. Prior to the full band sessions, Reese was asked to record and rehearse the songs in front of her producers Luigi Creatore and Hugo Peretti, with George Butcher accompanying Reese on piano. (Butcher was a veteran of Duke Ellington's orchestra.) During the rehearsal, Reese decided against singing "I Guess I'll Have to Change My Plan" because the male-perspective lyric was too difficult to change into a female perspective. For the song "And the Angels Sing", Reese created her own arrangement by opening with a vocalese rendition of Charlie Parker's "Bird of Paradise" saxophone solo, then by injecting bits of melody from "I Hear Music". Reese's additions were later incorporated by Hefti into the big band arrangement, such that the band quoted portions of "I Hear Music", and even more of "Bird of Paradise" than just the solo. Hefti's big band arrangement of "You're Driving Me Crazy" used a figure from Count Basie's recent recording of "Moten Swing".

RCA released an expanded edition of the album in 2002, with a second disc containing the rehearsal sessions of all of the songs performed by Reese backed by Butcher. Reese can be heard speaking to her producers.

Track listing
 "The Lady Is a Tramp" (Hart, Rodgers) 2:39
 "If I Could Be with You (One Hour Tonight)"  (Johnson) 2:50 
 "Let's Get Away from It All"  (Adair, Dennis) 2:29 
 "Thou Swell"  (Hart, Rodgers) 2:27 
 "You're Driving Me Crazy"  (Donaldson) 2:30 
 "Goody Goody"  (Malneck, Mercer) 3:46 
 "And the Angels Sing"  (Elman, Mercer) 2:42 
 "Baby Won't You Please Come Home?"  (Warfield, Williams) 3:11 
 "I'm Beginning to See the Light"  (Ellington, George, Hodges, James) 2:27 
 "I'll Get By (As Long as I Have You)"  (Ahlert, Turk) 2:38 
 "Blue Skies"  (Berlin) 1:49 
 "Someday (You'll Want Me to Want You)"  (Hodges) 5:16

Personnel 
 Della Reese – vocals
 Neal Hefti – arranger, conductor
 George Butcher – piano (rehearsal sessions)

Charts
Album

Single

References

Della Reese albums
1960 albums
Swing albums
RCA Victor albums
Albums arranged by Neal Hefti
Albums conducted by Neal Hefti
Albums produced by Hugo & Luigi